Aribam Syam Sharma is an Indian filmmaker and composer from Manipur. He debuted in the first Manipuri film Matamgi Manipur as an actor. In 1974, he directed his first movie Lamja Parshuram. It became the first Manipuri film to run for 100 days in the box office. His 1979 film Olangthagee Wangmadasoo was the first ever and the only Manipuri film to run for 32 weeks. It also broke the local box office records of Sholay.

His fourth film as a director, Imagi Ningthem (My Son, My precious) brought him international recognition when the film received the Montgolfiere d' Or at the Festival of Three Continents, Nantes in 1982.

His 1990 film Ishanou (The Chosen One) was screened in the Un Certain Regard section at the 1991 Cannes Film Festival.

In 2006, the Government of India awarded Sharma with the Padmashri, but he returned the award in February 2019 to protest against the Indian Government's decision to enact the Citizenship Amendment Bill of 2019.

In recognition of his contribution in the Indian documentary cinema, the Government of India conferred him Dr. V. Shantaram Lifetime Achievement Award in the 10th Mumbai International Film Festival, 2008 organised by the Films Division. Syam Sharma was given the Lifetime Achievement Award at the 7th Manipur State Film Festival 2010. He was also conferred with the Jewel of Manipuri Cinema award on 14 May 2015 by the Film Forum Manipur and the Manipur State Film Development Society.

Filmography

Feature films

Non-feature films

Bibliography

In popular culture
Documentary films focussing on the life and the filmmaking career of Aribam Syam Sharma was made by Gurumayum Nirmal Sharma and Th. Brajabidhu.

Another non-feature film on the filmmaker titled Pabung Syam was also made in 2020 by Haobam Paban Kumar and produced by Films Division of India. The film was selected at the 52nd International Film Festival of India 2021 in the non-feature section of Indian Panorama.

References

External links
 
Aribam Syam Sharma, Official website

Meitei Brahmins
Brahmins of Manipur
Film directors from Manipur
1936 births
Living people
People from Imphal
Recipients of the Padma Shri in arts
Indian documentary filmmakers
Indian autobiographers
20th-century Indian film directors
21st-century Indian film directors
Screenwriters from Manipur
Musicians from Manipur